Omid Safi  is a Sufi and Iranian-American Professor of Asian and Middle Eastern Studies at Duke University.  He served as the Director of Duke Islamic Studies Center from July 2014 to June 2019 and was a columnist for On Being. Safi specializes in Islamic mysticism (Sufism), contemporary Islamic thought and medieval Islamic history. He has served on the board of the Pluralism project at Harvard University and served as the co-chair of the steering committee for the Study of Islam and the Islamic Mysticism Group at the American Academy of Religion. 

Before joining Duke University, Safi was a professor at the University of North Carolina Chapel Hill. Before this, he was on faculty at Colgate University as an Assistant Professor of Philosophy and Religion from 1999-2004.

Life and work 
Omid Safi was born in Jacksonville, Florida  and is of Iranian descent.  He was raised in Iran and migrated from Tehran to the United States with his family in 1985.

Safi is a leader of the progressive Muslim movement, which he defines as encompassing
a number of themes: striving to realize a just and pluralistic society through a critical engagement with Islam, a relentless pursuit of social justice, an emphasis on gender equality as a foundation of human rights, and a vision of religious and ethnic pluralism.

After September 11, 2001 Safi was publicly critical of the intolerance and violence among Muslims that inspired the attacks, reminding Muslims that their role lay in "calling both Muslims and Americans to the highest good of which we are capable."

Safi's book Progressive Muslims (2003) contains a diverse collection of essays by and about progressive Muslims. He is one of a number of progressive scholars of Islam in the early 21st century whose work has described for Western readers the diverse range of Muslim thought in the last half of the 20th century. As such, he has been described by Kevin Eckstrom, editor-in-chief of the Religion News Service, as "on the front edge of a generation of scholars who, with one foot in both worlds, are trying to explain Islam and the West to each other."

Safi's more recent works deal with the themes of Islamic spirituality. These include the volume Memories of Muhammad: Why the Prophet Matters, which looks at Muslims' devotion to the Prophet Muhammad in a variety of contexts. 

His more recent work in this area is Radical Love: Teachings from the Islamic Mystical Tradition, which was published by Yale University Press in 2018. Radical Love refers to the teachings of the Path of 'Eshq (Arabic: 'Ishq), a distinct path of Islamic spirituality in which Divine and human love mingle.  Embodied in figures such as Rumi, Hafez, Sana'i, Ahmad Ghazali, and Kharaqani, this has been a powerful strand of Islamic spirituality in Persian, Turkish, and South Asian traditions.

Selected works

Books
 Progressive Muslims: On Justice, Gender, and Pluralism. Edited by Omid Safi (Oxford: Oneworld, 2003)
 The Politics of Knowledge in Premodern Islam. (Chapel Hill: UNC Press, 2006)
 Voices of Change (Vol. 5 in the 5 volume series: Voices of Islam), edited by Omid Safi. (Praeger, 2006)
 Memories of Muhammad: Why the Prophet Matters. (HarperOne, 2009)
 Voices of American Muslims. (New York: Hippocrene Books, Inc., 2005) By Linda Brandi Caetura with introductory essay and interview with Omid Safi
Radical Love: Teachings from the Islamic Mystical Tradition (Yale Univ. Press, 2018)

Articles
 "On the path of love Towards the Divine" (published in Sufi magazine)
 "A Muslim Spiritual Progressive Perspective on Palestine Israel" (published in Tikkun)
 "I and Thou in a fluid world: Beyond 'Islam vs. the West
 "Between 'Ijtihad of the Presupposition' and Gender Equality: Cross-Pollination between Progressive Islam and Iranian Reform", in Carl Ernst, ed., Rethinking Islamic Studies: From Orientalism to Cosmopolitanism (SC, 2010), pp. 72–96.
 "The Emergence of Progressive Islam in America," in Stephen Prothero, ed., A Nation of Religions (Chapel Hill: University of North Carolina, 2006), pp. 43–60.
 "Islamic Modernism," in Lindsay Jones et al., ed., Encyclopedia of Religion, Second Edition. (Farmington Hills, MI:  MacMillan, 2006), pp. 6095–6102.
 "What is Progressive Islam?," Newsletter for the International Institute for the Study of Islam in the Modern World 13, December 2003, pp. 48–49

Blog
   Blog at OnBeing

Postcast
  Sufi Heart podcast at BeHereNow Network

Online teaching
  Courses on Rumi; Martin Luther King & Malcolm X; and the Qur'an

Educational tours
 Tours to Turkey and Morocco

References

External links
 Omid Safi's weekly column for On Being
  Omid Safi's blog
 Interview with Omid Safi on "Memories of Muhammad: Why the Prophet Matters" at ReadTheSpirit.com

Year of birth missing (living people)
Living people
American Islamic studies scholars
Duke University alumni
University of North Carolina at Chapel Hill faculty
American Muslims
People from Jacksonville, Florida
Scholars of Sufism
21st-century Muslim scholars of Islam
Muslim reformers
American writers of Iranian descent
American male writers
Iranian expatriate academics
Muslim scholars of Islamic studies